The Kottankulangara Festival is an annual Hindu festival in Kerala, India in which thousands of male devotees dress-up as females and celebrate the festival. 

The festival takes place at  the Kottankulangara Devi Temple at Kollam, which is sacred to the goddess Bhagavathy. Every year this festival is celebrated on the 10th and 11th day of the Malayalam Meenam Maasam which falls on the 24th and 25th of the year.

On the festival day thousand of Devotees visit the Temple to seek the blessings of the Goddess Bhagavathy.  The men dress up in the female attire of their choice. Some wear Set sari, Pattu sari, half sari or even dance costumes.

References

External links

Kerala Festivals: Kottankulangara Chamayavilakku
Crossdressing Bodysuits - The Crossdresser Store

Cross-dressing
Hindu festivals in Kerala
Festivals in Kollam district
April observances
March observances